Nils Abraham Langlet (9 July 1868 – 30 March 1936; known by his second given name) was a Swedish chemist.

Biography
Langlet was born in Södertälje, Sweden. He was the son of architect Emil Victor Langlet (1824–1898) and his wife, author Clara Mathilda Ulrika Clementine Söderén (1832–1904). His brothers included author Valdemar Langlet (1872–1960).

From 1886 to 1896, he studied chemistry under Per Teodor Cleve (1840–1905) at Uppsala University, where he became a philosophy graduate in 1888, Philosophy Licentiate in 1893 and obtained a doctorate in 1896 and was made docent in the same year. 
In 1899, he became lecturer in Chemistry and Chemical Technology at the Chalmers University of Technology in Gothenburg, where he received a professorship in the same field in 1911. From 1926, when his professorship was divided, he was professor of Organic Chemistry.

In 1895, while working with Cleve in Uppsala, he made the independent discovery of the element helium (in the same year discovered by William Ramsay) in the mineral cleveite. Langlet was the first to correctly define its atomic weight.  He died in Gothenburg, Sweden.

References

1868 births
1936 deaths
People from Södertälje
Swedish chemists
Uppsala University alumni
Academic staff of the Chalmers University of Technology